Laurenz Rex (born 15 December 1999) is a Belgian cyclist, who currently rides for UCI WorldTeam .

Major results
2017
 8th E3 Harelbeke Junioren
2021
 8th Druivenkoers Overijse
2022
 1st Criterium du Brabant Wallon
 10th Brussels Cycling Classic
2023
1st Dorpenomloop Rucphen

Classics results timeline

References

External links

1999 births
Living people
Belgian male cyclists
Sportspeople from Marburg
21st-century Belgian people